James Culliford (8 September 1927 – 23 March 2002) was a British actor on stage, film and television.

Culliford was badly burned in a motoring accident that left the right side of his face partly disfigured. He met his life partner, the actor Alfred Lynch, at theatre acting evening classes. Some of his noted roles are The Entertainer (1960), The Trygon Factor (1966), and Quatermass and the Pit (1967). He also appeared in the Doctor Who serial Frontier in Space in 1973.

After suffering a stroke in 1972, he and Lynch moved from London to Brighton. They lived together until Culliford's death in 2002. Lynch died of cancer the following year.

Filmography

Television

References

External links

1927 births
2002 deaths
British male television actors
English gay actors
British male stage actors
British male film actors
20th-century British male actors
20th-century LGBT people